Erechthias kerri is a moth of the family Tineidae. It was first described by Otto Swezey in 1926. It is found in the Pacific region, including the French Frigate Shoals, Lisianski, Laysan, the Pearl and Hermes Reef, Johnston Island and Hawaii.

Color variations
There is much variation in the color pattern of the forewings. The forewings vary from nearly immaculate pale straw colored through variable maculations with dark brown scales to individuals that have extensive dark scaling. Unlike the wings of most of the species of Erechthias, the tips of the forewings are not upturned. If the wing tips are viewed when the wings are spread, the tips appear to be somewhat turned downward.

Development stages
The larvae feed on dead bunch grass, Eragrostis and Nicotiana species. The cocoon is composed of white silk with closely packed white coral reef sand, plant fragments, dried insect feces, and other debris. The cocoons give the appearance of being larval cases.

External links

Erechthiinae
Moths described in 1926